Chemistry is the second and final extended play by South Korean duo Trouble Maker, which consists of 4Minute's Hyuna and Beast's Hyunseung. It was released digitally on October 28, 2013 with the lead single "Now" (lit. "No Tomorrow").

Promotion and release
On October 4, 2013, Cube Entertainment revealed that Trouble Maker would be making their comeback. A representative said, "We have established their comeback as Trouble Maker to be made on the October 24 episode of Mnet's 'M! Countdown'.  As it has been a while since they were active as a unit, the both of them are fully engaged in practice and very nervous.

On October 23, a teaser video and photo was released which showcased a sexy concept; the release date was clarified to be October 28, and the lead single would be called "Now". On October 26, the official site was launched, showing 12 different teaser photos. The album was released on digital download on October 28, and on physical album on October 31. A special limited edition (3,000 copies), rated 19+, was released on November 12. Cube said this version shows a "level of allure and sexuality exceeding that of Trouble Maker as everyone knows it now".

Trouble Maker began promoting "Now" on October 30 on MBC Music's Show Champion The song received numerous first place awards in various music show broadcasts, a double crown in Mnet's M! Countdown (November 7, 14) and in KBS Music Bank (November 8,15), in MBC Music Core (November 9), in SBS Inkigayo (November 10) and a triple crown in MBC Music Show Champion (November 6, 13, 20).

Music video
The music video for "Now", released on October 24, was directed by Lee Gi-baek who also directed Beast's "Caffeine", "Shadow (Geurimja)" and "I'm Sorry". The choreography was done by Keone Madrid and Mariel Madrid, who have worked with Urban Dance Camp in Germany.

The music video has a "Bonnie and Clyde" theme. Jeff Benjamin of Billboard K-Town wrote that the video "feels like a concentrated effort to get Western attention". He also said, "'Now' shows the two K-pop idols engaging in very un-idol-like behavior: smoking cigarettes, drinking beer, there's even an implied threesome with Hyunseung. Still, it's the type of shock tactics that American pop fans have become indifferent to."

On November 3, 2013, Trouble Maker released an uncut version of the music video, which was twice as long as the original.

Track listing

Charts

On November 7, 2013, "Now" debuted at number 1 on the Gaon Digital Chart. The song reached the top of the Billboard K-Pop Hot 100 for the date of November 16, 2013.

Albums chart

Sales

Singles chart

Release history

Personnel 
 Hyuna – vocals, rap
 Hyunseung – vocals
 Shinsadong Tiger – producing, songwriting, arranger, music
 Rado – producing, songwriting, arranger, music
 LE – songwriting

References

External links

2013 EPs
Hyuna albums
Dance-pop EPs
Korean-language EPs
Cube Entertainment EPs